The 1987 New Orleans Saints season was the team's 21st year in the National Football League (NFL). The strike-shortened year was the Saints' first-ever winning season. The Saints also qualified for the postseason for the first time, riding largely on a nine-game winning streak to close the season. The Saints earned the second-best record in the NFL in 1987, but were in the same division as the team with the best record, the San Francisco 49ers, and entered the playoffs as a wild card. However, they were soundly defeated at home by the Minnesota Vikings in the Wild Card round of the playoffs, by a score of 44–10. The Vikings entered the playoffs with an 8–7 record and needed the Dallas Cowboys to defeat the St. Louis Cardinals on the final day of the season to qualify. The Saints' first winning season would be followed by another six consecutive non-losing seasons. Before the 1987 season, the Saints' non-losing seasons had consisted of only two 8–8 seasons, in 1979 and 1983. Head coach Jim Mora was named NFL Coach of the Year.

Offseason

NFL draft

Personnel

Staff

NFL replacement players 
After the league decided to use replacement players during the NFLPA strike, the following team was assembled:

Roster

Regular season

Schedule

Standings

Playoffs

NFC Wild Card Game 

In the Saints' first playoff game in history, the Vikings dominated the game by recording two sacks, forcing four turnovers, and allowing only 149 yards. Anthony Carter returned a punt for a touchdown, and future Saints quarterback Wade Wilson threw a Hail Mary pass for a touchdown to Hassan Jones on the last play of the first half, which was actually an untimed play after the Saints were penalized for offsides on the previous play (a half cannot end on an accepted penalty against the defense).

References

External links 
 1987 New Orleans Saints at Pro-Football-Reference.com

New Orleans
New Orleans Saints seasons
New